Route 382 is a provincial highway located in the Abitibi-Témiscamingue region in southwestern Quebec. The highway runs from Ville-Marie at the junction of Route 101 and ends south of Laforce. Between Lorrainville and Laverlochère-Angliers it overlaps Route 391.

Towns along Route 382

 Ville-Marie
 Duhamel-Ouest
 Lorrainville
 Laverlochère-Angliers
 Fugèreville
 Latulipe-et-Gaboury
 Belleterre

Major intersections

See also

 List of Quebec provincial highways

References

External links 
  Official Transports Quebec Map 
 Route 382 on Google Maps

382